Situation puzzles are often referred to as minute mysteries, lateral thinking puzzles or "yes/no" puzzles.

Situation puzzles are usually played in a group, with one person hosting the puzzle and the others asking questions which can only be answered with a "yes" or "no" answer.  Depending upon the settings and level of difficulty, other answers, hints or simple explanations of why the answer is yes or no, may be considered acceptable. The puzzle is solved when one of the players is able to recite the narrative the host had in mind, in particular explaining whatever aspect of the initial scenario was puzzling.

These puzzles are inexact and many puzzle statements have more than one possible fitting answer.  The goal however is to find out the story as the host has it in mind. Critical thinking and reading, logical thinking, as well as lateral thinking may all be required to solve a situation puzzle. The term lateral thinking was coined by Edward De Bono to denote a creative problem-solving style that involves looking at the given situation from unexpected angles, and is typically necessary to the solution of situation puzzles.

The term "lateral-thinking puzzle" was popularised by Paul Sloane in his 1992 book Lateral Thinking Puzzlers.

Example

One situation puzzle would be:

The question-and-answer segment might go something like this.
Question: Could the bartender hear him? Answer: Yes
Question: Was the bartender angry for some reason? A: No
Question: Was the gun a water pistol? A: No
Question: Did they know each other from before? A: No (or: "irrelevant" since either way it does not affect the outcome)
Question: Was the man's "thank you" sarcastic? A: No (or with a small hint: "No, he was genuinely grateful")
Question: Did the man ask for water in an offensive way? A: No
Question: Did the man ask for water in some strange way? A: Yes

Eventually the questions lead up to the conclusion that the man had the hiccups, and that his reason for requesting a drink of water was not to quench his thirst but to cure his hiccups.  The bartender realized this and chose instead to cure the hiccups by frightening the man with the gun. Once the man realized that his hiccups were gone, he no longer needed a drink of water, gratefully thanked the bartender, and left.

Terminology 
 Yope is a word devised to answer a question with yes and no simultaneously, in a sense saying Yes, but ... and No, but ... at the same time.  This would be used when it would be misleading to give a simple "yes" or "no" answer to the player's question. It can be compared to the Japanese and Korean term mu, which is often translated as meaning that the question must be "unasked", as it cannot be answered.
 N/a (or stating "irrelevant") is used when a question is not applicable to the current situation or when a "yes" or "no" answer would not provide any usable information to solving the puzzle.
 Irrelevant, but assume yes is used when the situation is the same regardless of what the correct answer to the question is, but assuming one direction will make further questioning easier or the situation more likely.  An example question that might have this answer from the puzzle above is: “Was the gun loaded?”

See also 
Twenty Questions

Further reading
 Edward De Bono, Lateral Thinking : Creativity Step by Step, Harper & Row, 1973, trade paperback,  300 pages, 
 The rec.puzzles archive of situation puzzles

References

Puzzles